The 1982–83 Auburn Tigers men's basketball team represented Auburn University in the 1982–83 college basketball season. The team's head coach was Sonny Smith, who was in his fifth season at Auburn. The team played their home games at Memorial Coliseum in Auburn, Alabama. 

Auburn's lone signee was Chuck Person, a freshman from Holy Family High School in Brantley, Alabama.

The team finished the season 15–13, 8–10 in SEC play. The Tigers lost in the first round of the 1983 SEC tournament to Alabama.

Roster

References

Auburn Tigers men's basketball seasons
Auburn
Auburn Tigers
Auburn Tigers